Christy Park is a park in south St. Louis, Missouri. Founded in 1910, the park is about 16.1 acres in size. It is named after William Tandy Christy, a businessman who founded a firebrick company. In 2012, the neighborhood playground was set ablaze.

References

Municipal parks in Missouri
Parks in St. Louis
Tourist attractions in St. Louis
1910 establishments in Missouri